The men's 400 metre individual medley competition of the swimming events at the 1979 Pan American Games took place on 3 July at the Piscina Olimpica Del Escambron. The last Pan American Games champion was Steve Furniss of the United States.

This race consisted of eight lengths of the pool. The first two lengths were swum using the butterfly stroke, the second pair with the backstroke, the third pair of lengths in breaststroke, and the final two were freestyle.

Results
All times shown are in minutes and seconds.

Heats
The first round was held on July 3.

Final 
The final was held on July 3.

References

Swimming at the 1979 Pan American Games